James Gang was an American hard rock band from Cleveland, Ohio. Formed in 1966, the group originally consisted of vocalist and keyboardist Phil Giallombardo, lead guitarist Greg Grandillo, rhythm guitarist Ronnie Silverman, bassist Tom Kriss, and drummer Jimmy Fox. When the band broke up in early 1977, the lineup featured constant member Fox and Giallombardo (who rejoined in 1976 after leaving in 1968), alongside bassist Dale Peters (who joined in 1969) and guitarist Bob Webb (who joined in 1976). Following their disbandment, the classic lineup of vocalist and guitarist Joe Walsh along side Peters and Fox have reunited on several occasions for one-off live performances and occasional tours.

History
James Gang was formed in 1966 by Phil Giallombardo, Ronnie Silverman, Tom Kriss and Jimmy Fox, who worked with a succession of lead guitarists early on – first Greg Grandillo, who was almost "immediately" replaced by Dennis Chandler, followed shortly thereafter by John "Mouse" Michalski. Before the end of 1966, Glenn Schwartz had taken over lead guitar duties. The next summer, Silverman left to join the army and was replaced in the group by Bill Jeric. At the end of 1967, Schwartz left to relocate to Los Angeles, California where he formed Pacific Gas & Electric. Schwartz was replaced in the new year by Joe Walsh. Shortly after Walsh's arrival, Giallombardo left and Silverman returned. On the eve of a show supporting Cream in June, Silverman left and the group became a trio, with Walsh taking over on lead vocals.

The lineup of Walsh, Kriss and Fox released James Gang's debut, Yer' Album, in March 1969. Just before recording the follow-up James Gang Rides Again that November, Kriss was replaced by Dale Peters. James Gang Rides Again was followed by Thirds and the band's first live album Live in Concert in 1971, before Walsh left at the end of the year to pursue new projects, later claiming that "I was frustrated just being the only melodic instrument [in the band] ... I wanted to expand and try something else." Early the next year, Peters and Fox were joined by two new members – vocalist Roy Kenner and guitarist Domenic Troiano, both formerly of Mandala and Bush.

After releasing Straight Shooter and Passin' Thru in 1972, Troiano left James Gang in August 1973. He was replaced immediately by Tommy Bolin, who debuted quickly on the band's next album Bang. After releasing the follow-up Miami in the summer of 1974, Kenner left the group that September to return to his native Toronto. He was followed the next month by Bolin. After a brief hiatus, Peters and Fox formed a new incarnation of James Gang in early 1975 with vocalist Robert "Bubba" Keith and guitarist Richard Shack, who recorded Newborn. By the end of the year, Keith had been replaced by original frontman Phil Giallombardo, while Shack had made way for Bob Webb, both of whom performed on the 1976 album Jesse Come Home. After a final period of touring, James Gang finally disbanded in early 1977.

Since their original breakup, James Gang's classic lineup of Joe Walsh, Dale Peters and Jimmy Fox have temporarily reunited on several occasions. The first time was in July 1991, when they performed "Funk #49" during a Walsh solo show. Next, the group played at an election rally for Bill Clinton in November 1996, followed by a performance on The Drew Carey Show in 1998. In February 2001, the trio (joined by keyboardist Mark Avsec) played three shows at the Rock and Roll Hall of Fame and Allen Theatre in Cleveland. In June 2005, the same lineup performed a pair of shows at the Beachland Ballroom. During August and September 2006, the band performed its longest reunion tour to date in the US. For the shows, the core trio were joined by keyboardist Bill Appleberry, plus backing vocalists Gia Ciambotti, Robbyn Kirmsse and Stacy Michelle. The band made their most recent performance at the Taylor Hawkins Tribute Concert at Wembley stadium on 3rd September 2022.

Members

Latest

Former

Touring

Timeline

Lineups

References

James Gang